Allium dentigerum is a plant species native to Gansu and Shaanxi Provinces in China. It grows on slopes and in pastures at elevations of 1500–2500 m.

Allium dentigerum has narrow, cylindrical bulbs up to 6 mm across. Scapes are up to 35 cm long, round in cross-section. Leaves are very narrow, usually about half as long as the scapes. Flowers are reddish-purple.

References

dentigerum
Onions
Flora of China
Flora of Gansu
Flora of Shaanxi
Plants described in 1930